The Archdeacon of Lynn is a senior ecclesiastical officer within the Diocese of Norwich.

As archdeacon is responsible for the disciplinary supervision of the clergy  within the area deaneries. The archdeaconry of Lynn was created from those of Norwich and of Norfolk on 28 August 1894.

List of archdeacons
1894–1903 (res.): Arthur Lloyd, Bishop suffragan of Thetford
1903–6 January 1926 (d.): John Bowers, Bishop suffragan of Thetford
1926–1946 (ret.): Harry Radcliffe (afterwards archdeacon emeritus)
1946–1953 (ret.): John Woodhouse, Bishop suffragan of Thetford
1953–28 September 1956 (d.): William Musselwhite
1957–1961 (ret.): Percival Smith (afterwards archdeacon emeritus)
1961–1972 (ret.): William Llewellyn (also first Bishop suffragan of Lynn from 1963)
1973–1980 (res.): Aubrey Aitken, Bishop suffragan of Lynn
1980–1987 (ret.): Geoffrey Grobecker (afterwards archdeacon emeritus)
1987–1998 (res.): Tony Foottit
1999–2009 (ret.): Martin Gray (afterwards archdeacon emeritus)
2009–2018 (ret.): John Ashe
9 September 20182022 (ret.): Ian Bentley (retired shortly before death, 31 May 2022)
1 October 2022present: Catherine Dobson

References

Lists of Anglicans
 
Diocese of Norwich
Lists of English people